Philip Arditti also credited as Philip Ishak Arditti, is a British-Turkish theatre and television actor of Jewish Sephardic descent, famous for his role as Uday Hussein in the four episode House of Saddam television docudrama. He also appeared in the film Red 2, a sequel to 2010's Red. He was part of the team that founded the Arcola Theatre in London.

Early years 
Arditti was born in Geneva in 1979 and grew up in Istanbul and moved to London in 1999. He graduated from the Royal Academy of Dramatic Art in 2004.

Career 
He began his TV and film career in some of British television's most popular series including Casualty, Spooks and Silent Witness. He also appeared in the British comedy drama film Happy-Go-Lucky.

His radio plays include Snow (adapted from the novel by Orhan Pamuk) and 

In 2013, he appeared in Turkish television series Son and in the film Singing Women directed by Turkish film director Reha Erdem. In 2014 he appeared in the BBC/Sundance TV drama The Honourable Woman directed by Hugo Blick opposite Maggie Gyllenhaal where he played Saleh Al-Zahid.

In 2014, he played a goatherd in the Game of Thrones episode, The Laws of Gods and Men.

On the stage Arditti played Yossarian, the New York bomb aimer, in Joseph Heller's stage adaptation of his novel Catch-22 on a UK national tour directed by Rachel Chavkin.He is a regular performer at London's National Theatre, including roles in England People Very Nice (2009), Blood and Gifts (2010), Holy Rosenbergs (2011). In September 2017 he played Uri Savir in J.T. Rogers stage play  Oslo at the venue's Lyttelton auditorium, accompanying the production when it transferred to the West End in the following month.

Filmography

Film

Television

Theatre

References

External links
 
 http://philiparditti.com
 http://www.hbo.com/films/houseofsaddam/cast/philip_arditti.html
  http://www.gazillionmovies.com/Actor/P/Ph/PhilipArditti.htm

Living people
Male actors from London
British male television actors
Swiss emigrants to the United Kingdom
Swiss Jews
Alumni of RADA
Naturalised citizens of the United Kingdom
Male actors from Istanbul
Jewish British male actors
1979 births